This is a list of notable Ghanaian filmmakers listed in alphabetic order by surname.

A
Kofi Adu
John Akomfrah
King Ampaw
Kwaw Ansah
John Apea
Juliet Asante
Nana Adwoa Awindor
Nana Oforiatta Ayim

B
Akosua Busia

D
Leila Djansi

F
Shirley Frimpong-Manso

G

 Charles Allen Gyimah

H
Rev Dr Chris Tsui Hesse

O
Nii Kwate Owoo
Akosua Adoma Owusu

S
Socrate Safo

References

Filmmakers

Ghana